Komodo is a 1999 horror thriller film directed by Michael Lantieri. On a holiday with his parents, fifteen-year-old Patrick witnesses them get attacked and killed. The shock prevents Patrick from remembering what happened, and he is assigned to young psychiatrist Victoria Juno for help. Patrick attempts to come to terms with his loss, but when he and his aunt Annie return to the scene, Patrick must face the creature responsible for their demise. The film was released on September 15, 1999.

Plot
During the 1980s a black market shipment of exotic animals docks at Emerald Isle, North Carolina. A driver transports several animals to another location. During the drive, he notices a distinctive smell and pulls over the van. He presumes a crate of reptilian eggs are rotten and tosses them into the swamp. Nineteen years later, the Connelly family arrives at the island to return to their vacation home though, in recent years, a major oil company has been polluting the local environment. During their stay, Patrick (Kevin Zegers) and his dog, Buster, encounter a small lizard. In an attempt to catch it, Patrick stays out later than usual and his parents go out looking for him. Patrick heads home after hearing his parents calling, but is attacked by an unseen creature. Barely escaping, he witnesses his family being devoured by the creatures. Patrick survives and is found in a state of shock.

Some time later, Patrick's grandmother reaches out to Dr. Victoria Juno (Jill Hennessy), a young psychiatrist, to help Patrick come to terms with his grief. His aunt Annie (Nina Landis) is indifferent to Victoria's presence and adamantly against him returning to the island. Victoria, with the grandmother's support, takes Patrick back to the island along with Annie. At the Connellys' old vacation home, Annie is attacked and wounded. While Victoria tends to Annie's wounds, Patrick is awakened by growling and comes downstairs. While in the kitchen, he has a flashback to the attack on his dog and runs to Victoria panicked. When she asks him what he saw, he points behind her to reveal a massive Komodo dragon. Annie is killed by the creature and Victoria and Patrick barely escape, revealing that there are several more dragons.

They find the boat captain, Martin, severely injured. Driving frantically, they nearly crash into Oates (Billy Burke) and his maintenance co-worker Denby (Paul Gleeson), who were sent to kill the reptiles. Oates and Denby tend to Martin, who is succumbing to infection from wounds caused by bacteria in the Komodo's saliva. Oates and Denby call for help from Bracken (Simon Westaway), the man who sent them to the island to kill the Komodos.

Bracken refuses to take them off the island until they kill all the dragons. Patrick runs off into the long grass. Victoria tries to follow, but is pulled back onto the road by Oates. Denby says that Patrick cut out the heart of a Komodo dragon that had previously been killed. The group travel to the oil company office station to seek shelter and get medicine for Martin. He later dies,as well as Denby, who is attacked in another room. Bracken radios Oates and says a helicopter will be coming soon and that the dragons should be all killed by that time. Oates reveals to Victoria that he was a former biologist and his wife a geologist hired by the oil company to survey the environment; in the field, Oates and his wife are separated and he never sees her again. Police believe Oates killed his wife and with no evidence to prove his innocence, Bracken presented Oates with an escape in return for taking care of the Komodo "problem".

They head off in search of Patrick at his old hang-out, a filtration center. Separated, Victoria is attacked by one of the Komodos but is saved by Patrick. Patrick runs off again as Victoria is attacked by another Komodo dragon. Meanwhile, Oates is attacked by one of the creatures and manages to kill it; however, he is bitten. He then saves Victoria from the attacking dragon by shooting it. They later find Patrick and Victoria tells him the oil company knew of the Komodos, but covered it up to protect themselves, and that his parents' death was not his fault. Immediately afterwards, one of the remaining Komodos attacks. Oates lures the dragon into leaking oil/gasoline and attempts to kill it by igniting the oil with one of Denby's cigars. The dragon escapes the fire and rushes after Victoria, but she kills it by using a rock to bash part of a broomstick handle into its head that she earlier injured it with.

The helicopter finally arrives with Bracken. Oates turns up at the station alive and steals the helicopter to leave Bracken on the island with the creatures. Victoria and Patrick try to make their way back to Martin's boat when another large Komodo dragon tracks them down. However, Oates flies overhead in the helicopter and shoots a flare gun into the Komodo dragon's mouth, incinerating it. They return to the mainland unharmed. While resting on the sidewalk back in town, the sheriff stops to ask them if everything is all right. Patrick responds "Never better".

Cast
 Jill Hennessy as Dr. Victoria Juno
 Billy Burke as Oates
 Kevin Zegers as Patrick Connelly
 Michael Edward-Steven as Captain Martin Gris
 Paul Gleeson as Denby
 Nina Landis as Aunt Annie
 Simon Westaway as Bracken
 Bruce Hughes as Mr. Connelly
 Jane Conroy as Mrs. Connelly
 Melissa Jaffer as Grandmother
 Brian McDermott as Sheriff Gordon
 Nique Needles as Hippie

Release
Komodo had a limited theatrical release in summer 1999, with a VHS release in November of the same year. The DVD format of the film followed. The film was distributed by the Eastern limited branch of Scanbox Entertainment, Scanbox Asia Pacific Limited.

External links
 
 

1999 films
1999 horror films
1990s science fiction thriller films
Australian natural horror films
Australian horror thriller films
Australian science fiction horror films
1990s science fiction horror films
Films scored by John Debney
Films about lizards
Films about post-traumatic stress disorder
Films set on islands
Films shot in Brisbane
Scanbox Entertainment films
Australian monster movies
1990s English-language films